The Malibu languages are a poorly attested group of dead languages once spoken along the Magdalena River in Colombia.  Material exists only for two of the numerous languages mentioned in the literature: Malibú and Mocana.

Classification
The Malibu languages have previously been grouped into a single family with the Chimila language.  However, Chimila is now known to be a Chibchan language, and Adelaar & Muysken regard the grouping of Chimila with the Malibu languages as "without any factual basis".

Family division
Rivet initially listed three Malibu tribes, each with its own language:
Malibú, spoken near the Magdalena River from Tamalameque to Tenerife
Mocaná, spoken by the Mokaná people in the region east of Cartagena (Rivet 1947b; Simón 1882-1892, vol. 4, p. 298, only two words.)
Pacabuey, also known as Sompallón or Laguna Malibu, spoken near the Zapatoza lagoon (Unattested.)

To this list, Loukotka adds six more languages, all of which are unattested (excluding Chimila):
Papale, spoken on the Fundación River
Coanoa or Guanoa, spoken on the Cesar River
Zamirua, spoken on the Ariguaní River
Cospique, spoken somewhere in the Department of Magdalena
Mompox, spoken near the city of Santa Cruz de Mompox
Calamari, spoken along the coast south of Cartagena to Coveñas

Vocabulary
Rivet gives a brief list of words from Malibú and Mocana, but does not distinguish the two languages.  A selection of these is provided below:

tahana – manzanilla tree
malibu – chief
man – small boat
ytaylaco / yteylaco / yntelas / ytaylas – devil, deity
entaha / enbutac – cassava

References

 
Languages of Colombia
Language families
Unclassified languages of South America
Extinct languages of South America